Vitaliy Semenovych Chuhunnikov (born 21 May 1974, Bilhorod-Dnistrovskyi, Ukraine) is a Ukrainian politician, member of the Verkhovna Rada.

In 1996-2012, he worked at various insignificant jobs.

In 2012-2014, Chuhunnikov was a member of the Verkhovna Rada representing UDAR party.

In 2014-2016, he served as a Governor of Rivne Oblast.

References

External links
 Profile at the Official Ukraine Today portal

1974 births
Living people
People from Bilhorod-Dnistrovskyi
Kharkiv Polytechnic Institute alumni
Governors of Rivne Oblast
Seventh convocation members of the Verkhovna Rada
Ukrainian Democratic Alliance for Reform politicians